Victor de la Peña Pérez (14 September 1933 – 1 July 2015), was a bishop of the Roman Catholic Church.

He was born 14 Sep 1933 in Villaldemiro, Spain and was ordained a priest of Order of Friars Minor on 3 Jul 1959.
On 3 Jul 1983 he was made auxiliary bishop of Requena (Peru) and titular bishop of Avitta Bibba.

On 15 May 1987 he was appointed Vicar Apostolic of Requena, Peru and he resigned this position on 30 July 2005, just short of his 71st birthday.

References

1933 births
2015 deaths
Spanish Roman Catholic titular bishops
Spanish Roman Catholic bishops in South America
Roman Catholic bishops of Requena